Hopea andersonii is a tree in the family Dipterocarpaceae, native to Borneo. It is named for J. A. R. Anderson, a forest officer on the island.

Description
The bark is cracked or flaky.

Distribution and habitat
Hopea andersonii is endemic to Borneo. Its habitat is lowland dipterocarp forest.

Conservation
Hopea andersonii has been assessed as vulnerable on the IUCN Red List. It is threatened mainly by logging for its timber. It is also threatened by conversion of land for agriculture and plantations. The species mostly occurs outside of protected areas.

References

andersonii
Endemic flora of Borneo
Plants described in 1967